Ablington is a small village in the English county of Wiltshire, on the River Avon, close to the village of Figheldean and about  north of the town of Amesbury.

Barrow Clump, a prehistoric site re-used as a burial ground for an Anglo-Saxon village, is some 700 metres east of Ablington.

The settlement was recorded as Alboldintone in the Domesday Book. Ablington farmhouse is an 18th-century thatched building, extended in c. 1880 and at later dates.

For local government purposes, Ablington is part of Figheldean civil parish.

References

External links

 
 

Villages in Wiltshire